Channel 10 (legally known as SAETA TV Canal 10) is a Uruguayan free-to-air television channel based in Montevideo, founded in 1956 by Raul Fontaina as the first TV broadcaster in the country and the fourth in Latin America. SAETA ("Arrow") is a backronym for "Anonymous Society of Television Broadcasting and Appendants" (Sociedad Anónima Emisora de Televisión y Anexos). The channel is owned by Grupo Fontaina - De Feo.

Programming

Current 

 Original programming

 Informativo Carve (radio news)
 Subrayado (news)
 Got Talent Uruguay (talent show)
 Arriba gente (magazine)
 La mañana en casa (magazine)
 La tarde en casa (magazine)
 Puglia invita (interviews)
 Consentidas (interviews)
 Vida y obra (interviews)
 Día cero (documentaries)
 La peluquería de don Mateo (entertainment)
 Polémica en el bar (talk show)
 Punto Penal (sports magazine) 
 Mejor con música (music)
 ¿Quién quiere ser millonario? (quiz show)
 Got Talent Uruguay (talent show)
 La Voz Uruguay (singing competition)

 Acquired programming

 Caso Cerrado (court show; Telemundo)
 Blue Bloods (fiction; CBS)
 CSI: Miami (fiction; CBS)
 FBI (fiction; CBS)
 The Mentalist (fiction; CBS)
 Bir Zamanlar Çukurova / Tierra amarga (fiction; ATV)
 Sefirin Kızı / La hija del embajador (fiction; Star TV)

Former 

 Original programming

 Decalegrón (comedy)
 MasterChef (talent show)
 Pasapalabra (game show)
 Escape perfecto (game show)
 El juego del año (game show)
 Salven el millón (game show)
 Bien de bien (game show)
 Bendita TV (entertainment)
 Caleidoscopio (interviews)
 Debate abierto (interviews)
 Dicho y hecho (interviews)
 Zona urbana (political)
 Deporte total (sports magazine)
 Charoná TV (children show)

 Acquired programming

 Ahora caigo (game show; Antena 3)
 The Simpsons
 İstanbullu Gelin / Sureya (fiction; Star TV)
 Kadın / Coraje de mujer (fiction; Fox Turkey)
 Kırgın Çiçekler / Flores de cristal (fiction; ATV)
 Kızım / ¿Y tú quién eres? (fiction; TV8)
 Meryem (fiction; Kanal D)

Antenna
Channel 10's transmitting antenna, measuring 187 meters in height, is called the Saeta tower.  It was built and inaugurated some time after the channel moved to its current address.  It stems from the idea and subsequent efforts of Milton Fontaina.  Today it is the highest structure in Montevideo, and can be seen from many parts of the city. Over the past 5 years, Channel 12, of Uruguay, rent a portion of the antenna to transmit their programming.

Logo
In 1972, the channel adopted a new logo depicting the number 10 surrounded by a CRT shape, with the number 1 depicting an arrow, and the number 0 identical to the American network CBS Eye logo. A blue background was used with the advent of color television. In 1992, the central sphere of the 0 became colorized. In 2002, the arrow 1 was removed, and the Uruguayan flag was adopted as background. The logo was last modified in 2006, with the chromed contour removed and the background chanced back to blue.

Film

In the year 2006 the channel signed a contract with film companies: Warner Brothers, 20th Century Fox, Paramount and Dreamworks, to transmit the most recent releases of these film companies.  These releases are already being cast in "Film Festival", a program that airs Monday at 9:00 pm.  A person specializing in film on Channel 10 is Jackie Rodriguez Stratta, for many years in Saeta.

Competitions

It was the first channel to create a talent competition, in 1996, by virtue of its 40 years.  Then Channel 4 did the same in 2004, and in 2006, celebrating its 50 years of new Channel 10 conducted a contest called CONTA, which was to create: series, novels, cartoons, etc., all of this for CONTA and Channel 10 .  In 2007 premiered the first prize in the national fiction series: "Flat 8".  The 5-Setiembre/2007 premiered another production CONTA called History Clinic. Cooking competition MasterChef was aired from 2017 to 2019, and Got Talent Uruguay debuted in 2020.

Sports Events 

Channel 10 broadcasts live matches of FIFA tournaments and qualifiers in simulcast with Tenfield (vía VTV).

References

External links
Official Site of Channel 10

Television networks in Uruguay
Television stations in Uruguay
Television channels and stations established in 1956
1956 establishments in Uruguay
Mass media in Montevideo
Spanish-language websites